Daman may refer to: place

Places
Dadra and Nagar Haveli and Daman and Diu, a union territory in India
Daman and Diu, former union territory of India, now part of Dadra and Nagar Haveli and Daman and Diu
Daman district, India
Daman, India, a city in India
Daman District, Afghanistan
Daman, Afghanistan, a village
Daman, Nepal, a village
Dammam, a city in Saudi Arabia 
Damaan Valley (Daman valley), a valley in Pakistan

People
Saint Daman, Irish Christian saint
Damara people, also known as the Daman, an ethnic group in Namibia
Heshana Khan (died 619), personal name Ashina Daman, a khan of the Western Turkic Khaganate
Daman Hongren (601-674), Chinese Buddhist patriarch
Rick Daman, Dutch sprint canoer
Ustad Daman (1911-1984), real name Chiragh Deen, Punjabi poet and mystic
William Daman (died 1591), musician in England

Other uses
Daman Indo-Portuguese language, spoken in Daman, India
Daman (2001 film), Indian Hindi-language film starring Raveena Tandon
 Daman (2022 film), Indian Odia-language film starring Babushaan Mohanty and Dipanwit Dashmohapatra
Daman, National Health Insurance Company, Abu Dhabi, United Arab Emirates
Battle of Dasman Palace, also called the Battle of Daman, fought on August 2–3, 1990, during the Iraqi invasion of Kuwait
Cyclone Daman, December 2007
 Daman, a term used in some Bible translations for the rock hyrax

See also
Doman (disambiguation)